Viramgam is a taluka of Ahmedabad District, India.

References

Ahmedabad district
Talukas of Gujarat